Bonett or Bonétt is a surname. Notable people with the surname include: 

Emery Bonett (1906–1995), pen name of Felicity Winifred Carter, English author and playwright
John Bonett (1906–1989), pen name of John Hubert Arthur Coulson, English author
Paul Bonett (1930–2019), Maltese football referee
Shaun Bonétt (born 1971), Australian property developer